Baulkham Hills High School (colloquially known as Baulko) is a government-funded  academically selective co-educational secondary day school, located in Baulkham Hills in the Hills District of Sydney, New South Wales, Australia.

The principal is Wayne Humphreys. Consistently ranked as one of the state's top schools academically, the school was ranked second in the NSW Higher School Certificate in 2016, 2017 and 2020, ranked fifth in 2018, and ranked third in 2021. In 2010, the school was ranked the most popular school in NSW for high school applications.

History 
Baulkham Hills High School was established in 1971 as a public comprehensive high school. It was officially opened on 23 March 1974 by the then Governor, Sir Roden Cutler. For the first year, students and teachers at the school were relocated to nearby Castle Hill High School whilst Baulkham Hills High School was still under construction. The school's first selective cohort was in 1990, with all grades being selective by 1995. 

The school was built on the site of a former orange orchard, with the region having once been a major orange producing area of Sydney. This history is acknowledged by the use of an orange on the school logo. The use of the word "Persevere" as the school motto encourages students to persevere in all their studies."The school emblem consists of the school name and the motto "PERSEVERE". It also shows an orange, as Baulkham Hills area was one of the main orange producing areas of the State, with the school being built on a former orange orchard."Acknowledgement of the agricultural history of the area is also reflected in the naming of the four intramural sports houses of the school, which are named after four prominent early European settlers in the area: MacDougall (red), Suttor (blue), Meehan (yellow) and Hughes (green).

Admissions and Enrollment 
Total enrollment in junior years (Year 7 to Year 10) is approximately 180 students per year group, and around 200 per year group in senior years (Year 11 and Year 12), due to transfers from other schools.  the total enrollment was 1,230 students.

As a selective school, entry into the school in Year 7 is based upon results in a statewide examination known as the Selective High Schools Test. In 2020, the lowest admitted score was 234 out of the maximum 300. Entry into vacant places in later stages is based on a reserve list and other criteria: mainly reports and academic achievements from previous years.

Facilities

Departments and staff rooms
There are ten staff rooms for all of the faculties.
English (upstairs C Block)
History (downstairs D Block)
Technology and Industrial Arts (upstairs F Block)
Languages Other Than English (LOTE) (upstairs D Block)
Mathematics (upstairs B Block)
PDHPE (E Block)
Science (E & H Block)
Social Sciences (upstairs D Block)
Support Unit (downstairs C Block)
CAPA and Music (upstairs G Block)

Extracurricular Activities
The school holds annual sports carnivals for swimming, cross country and athletics. Selected students compete in wider regional competitions, from Zone and Area to the CHS (Combined High Schools). There are 2 teachers who are the sports organisers overseeing sport.

Tri-School Tournament 
The Tri-School Tournament was first held in 2011 between Baulkham Hills, James Ruse Agricultural High School and Girraween High School. Teams from each school participated in basketball, soccer and touch football. Baulkham Hills obtained first place in both the 2011 and 2012 tournaments.

Quad School Tournament 
Starting 2013, Penrith High School joined the sporting tournament previously known as the Tri-School Tournament between Baulkham Hills High School, James Ruse Agricultural High School and Girraween High School. In addition to basketball, soccer and touch football, Penrith hosted table tennis in 2013. Again, Baulkham Hills High School won the tournament.  The competition returned in 2014, with Baulkham Hills hosting basketball, Girraween hosting touch football, James Ruse hosting soccer and Penrith hosting volleyball. Again, Baulkham Hills High School won the tournament. 

Since the introduction of Quadschools, Baulkham Hills have won the competition 10 times, 9 of them being consecutively, and Penrith has won once.

Academic 
A variety of academic extra-curricular activities are offered, in various subject areas.
Tournament of Minds
Future Problem Solving
Mock Trial
OzCLO (Computational and Linguistics Olympiad)
Debating
Physics, Chemistry and Biology Olympiad Team
Mathematics Olympiad Team
Australian and New Zealand Brain Bee Competition

Sport 
In addition to sporting competitions and tournaments such as Zone, Area and CHS, the school offers additional sporting activities to selected students, including:
Knockout Regional Teams (Basketball, Volleyball, Touch Football, Table Tennis)
Regional Championship Sports
Quad Schools Tournament, against James Ruse Agricultural High School, Penrith High School and Girraween High School (Baulko has won for several years in a row now)

Cadets 
Australian Army Cadets is a youth development organisation with ties to the Australian Army. Cadets parade in the school quadrangle (the main open space in the centre of the school) every Thursday afternoon. In this time, recruits and intermediate cadets are instructed by older students who have earned the rank of a non-commissioned officer, in drill, military traditions, navigation, survival, fieldcraft and leadership.

Creative and performing arts 
The school offers various activities in the field of creative and performing arts, including:
School Bands, including Junior, Intermediate, Concert, Senior, and Symphonic Wind Ensemble.
Specialised bands, including String Ensemble, Big Band, and Orchestra.
School Choir
Music Nights
Variety Night
Drama Club
Photography Club
Art Club

Other Extracurriculars
Chess Club
Green Group
Outreach (A club that organises events for charity)
Baulko Bulletin 
Social Justice (Political debate and raising awareness for social issues)
Business Society
B-Soc (Business Society)
B-Well (Mental-health club)
Soul Purpose (ISCF)
Spectrums (LGBT club)

Notable alumni
 Greg Combetformer Member for Charlton (2007–2013); former federal minister in the Rudd and Gillard governments; former Secretary of the Australian Council of Trade Unions (2000–2007) 
 Sam Dastyariformer Senator for New South Wales (2013–2017); General Secretary of the NSW branch of the Labor Party (2010–2013)
 Jayne JagotJudge of the High Court of Australia
 Stephanie Schweitzerathlete; represented Australia at the 2012 London Paralympics

Notable teachers 
Gordon Smith (ret.)wrestler, represented Australia in the 1976 Montreal Olympics
Jacob Groth  runner, represented Australia at 2010, 2014 Commonwealth Games and 2004 Junior world championships 
Jeffrey Sinclair  had an affair with a student, was later fired

See also 

 List of government schools in New South Wales
 Education in Australia
 List of selective high schools in New South Wales

References

External links 
 
 Baulkham Hills High School Army Cadet Unit website

Selective schools in New South Wales
Educational institutions established in 1971
Public high schools in Sydney
1971 establishments in Australia
Baulkham Hills, New South Wales